The National Serigraph Society was founded in 1940 by a group of artists involved in the WPA Federal Art Project, including Anthony Velonis, Max Arthur Cohn, and Hyman Warsager. The creation of the society coincided with the rise of serigraphs being used as a medium for fine art. Originally called the Silk Screen Group, the name was soon changed to the National Serigraph Society.

The National Serigraph Society had its own gallery, the Serigraph Gallery at 38 West 57th Street in New York City. They published a quarterly newsletter called the "Serigraph Quarterly." The Society had lectures, published prints, and coordinated traveling shows.

In "The Complete Printmaker: Techniques, Traditions, Innovations", the authors wrote that this organization, by 1940, had an active program of "traveling exhibits, lectures, and portfolios of prints (that) helped to sustain and broaden interest in the serigraph. Artists such as Ben Shahn, Mervin Jules, Ruth Gikow, Edward Landon, and Hyman Warsager were intrigued by the medium". 

In their 1970 book “Silk-Screen Printing for Artists & Craftsmen”, Mathilda V. and James A. Schwalbach wrote that a “major force in the development of serigraphy as a fine art was the formation in 1940 of the National Serigraph Society. It has set standards of excellence and has sent hundreds of exhibitions of its members’ work to countries all over the world. These exhibitions are responsible for a good deal of museum interest in the purchase of original prints as part of museum collections”.

J.I. Biegeleisen and Max Arthur Cohn (a co-founder of the Society noted above), writing in 1942 about the origin and development of serigraphy, observed: "Specially noteworthy has been the work of the National Serigraph Society, New York, which has been the source of inspiration, clearing house, and temple of artists and print makers everywhere. The National Serigraph Society and its active director, Doris Meltzer, have been largely responsible for promoting this new print form and raising it to the level of a museum art form"..

Dallas Museum of Art Exhibits
In 1944, 1947, and 1951 the Dallas Museum of Art held exhibitions of the National Serigraph Society.

The artists listed in the checklists for these shows include:

 Adolf Aldrich
 Virginia (Vae) Barnes
 Charles Barrows
 B. Berkman-Hunter
 Sarah Berman
 George Beyer
 Joseph Biel (1891-1943)
 Morris Blackburn
 Dorr Bothwell 
 William Boughton
 Louis Bunce
 Ruth Chaney
 Max Arthur Cohn
 Marion Cunningham
 Frank Davidson
 Roy DeCarava
 James Egleson
 Ray Euffa
 Francine Felsenthal
 Harold Fiedler
 Richard Floethe
 Arthur Flory
 Syd Fossum
 Louise A. Freedman
 Ruth Gikow
 Maxwell Gordon
 Harry Gottlieb
 F. Wynn Graham
 Lena Gurr
 Robert Gwathmey
 Abraham P. Hankins
 Hananiah Harari
 Riva Helfond
 August Henkel
 Philip Hicken
 Ernest Hoff
 Ernest Hopf
 Hoyt Howard
 Marion Huse
 William H. Johnson
 Mervin Jules
 Dora Kaminsky
 Charles Keller (1914-2006)
 Robert Leland Kiley
 Bernard A. Kohn
 Chet La More
 Edward Landon
 Gretchen Lansford
 Gladys M. Lux
 Guy Maccoy
 Marie R. Macpherson
 Beatrice Mandelman
 Henry Mark
 James H. Mcconnell
 Joseph Meert 
 Doris Meltzer
 Isaac Lane Muse
 Elizabeth Olds
 Geno Pettit
 William Herbert Plant
 Herbert William Pratt
 Leonard Pytlak
 Mildred Rackley
 Joseph Rajer
 Hulda D. Robbins
 Ruth Starr Rose
 Harry Shokler
 Harry Shoulberg
 Kurt Sluizer
 Bernard Steffen
 Harry Sternberg
 Abram Tromka 
 Russell Twiggs
 Mary Van Blarcom
 Albert Urban
 Anthony Velonis
 Sylvia Wald
 Hyman Warsager
 Carol Weinstock
 Sol Wilson

References 

American artist groups and collectives
Arts organizations